Lauren Williams may refer to:

 Lauren Williams (footballer) (born 1994), American-born professional footballer for Saint Kitts and Nevis
 Lauren Williams (ice hockey) (born 1996), Canadian ice hockey player
 Lauren Williams (journalist), American journalist and former editor-in-chief of Vox
 Lauren Williams (mathematician), American mathematician at Harvard University
 Lauren Williams (taekwondo) (born 1999), British taekwondo athlete
 Lauryn Williams (born 1983), American sprinter and bobsledder